Olesia Morhunets-Isaienko (born November 17, 1984 in Kozelets, Chernihiv Oblast, Ukraine) is a Ukrainian film director, producer, editor, screenwriter, member of the Ukrainian Film Academy. Wife of Andrii Isaienko.

Biography 
She graduated of the Kyiv National I. K. Karpenko-Kary Theatre, Cinema and Television University.

She worked as a director and editing director in the company "Technomediia" (2006-2013). She taught editing in the studio of Taras Maliarevych (2011-2012) and in the children's studio "Red Dog" (2016-2017). In 2014, she received a presidential grant to create a script for the documentary film "Music of the Monocle" about the life and work of Danylo Demutskyi. She worked with the NGO "Open politics" (2016-2017).

Since 2015 she is a member of the jury of the international literary competition "Koronatsiia Slova".

Filmography 
Film director:
 "And every river" (2022)
 "Shchedryk" (2021)
 "Deportation 44-46" (2021)
 "Frontier. The Grubeshev operation" (2019)
 "The Tale of Money" (2017)
 "Violonchel" (2014)
 "Cars" (2008)
 "Lubenochek" (2006)
 "Molfar" (2005)
 "Svichado eternal" (2004)

Producer
 "And every river" (2022)
 "Violonchel" (2014)

Editor
 "Violonchel" (2014)
 "Sakura" (2013)

Screenwriter
 "And every river" (2022)

Awards and honors

References

External links 
 

Ukrainian film directors
Ukrainian producers
Ukrainian editors
Ukrainian screenwriters
1984 births
Living people